Covão dos Conchos is an artificial lake in the Serra da Estrela mountains in Portugal that is famous for its Bell-mouth spillway.

The spillway was built in 1955 with the aim of diverting water from Ribeira das Naves to Lagoa Comprida. It is a part of a hydro-electric dam system of Serra da Estrela. This sci-fi-looking spillway was little-known until photos of the hole went viral in 2016. Over the last 60 years moss and foliage has grown onto the mouth of the funnel, adding to its ethereal allure. It has a height of 4.6 meters and has a circumference of 48 meters. The tunnel that collects the water is 1,519 meters long.

References

Reservoirs in Portugal
Serra da Estrela